The Oarsome Foursome is the nickname for an Australian men's rowing coxless four crew who competed with a clear lineage between 1990 and 2012, winning two Olympic gold medals and one silver medal, two world championships as a coxless four, and additional world championship titles in coxed boats. Members of the Oarsome Foursome when split into pairs placed first and second in the 1998 World Rowing Championships and won gold at the 2008 Beijing Olympics.

1st combination
They first achieved success seated as Nick Green (bow), Mike McKay (two), Samuel Patten (three) and James Tomkins stroke, when they won gold at the 1990 World Rowing Championships in Lake Barrington. They were coached by Noel Donaldson a former Victorian and national representative coxswain who had taken to coaching after competitive retirement. Donaldson encouraged periods of relaxation within the crew's training regime and it's been reported that the rowers spent the morning of that final indulging in a relaxed round of golf.

2nd combination
Patten was replaced by Andrew Cooper in 1991, and another World Championship title was won in Vienna 1991. Around this time they were accused by former Norwegian coach Thor Nilsson of not being serious enough about their training. In lead-up races before the 1992 Olympics the crew's dominance was challenged by fours from the Netherlands and the USA but after a seat swap by Donaldson between Cooper and Green and the adoption of the new short "cleaver" blades they won gold at Barcelona 1992 and became household names crowned Moomba Monarchs (popularly called Kings of Moomba)  and appearing in television advertisements for the Australian canned fruit brand Goulburn Valley.

3rd combination
Andrew Cooper retired in 1995, and Drew Ginn took the bow seat. In that combination they won a second Olympic gold medal at Atlanta 1996 cementing their popularity and fame and elevating the profile of rowing in Australia. Following a break in 1997 they returned to World Class Rowing in 1998 winning gold at the 1998 Cologne World Championships as a coxed four steered by Brett Hayman. At those same championships McKay and Ginn took silver as a coxless pair and Green, Tomkins and Hayman were also crowned World Champions in a coxed pair.

The Australian coxless four at Sydney 2000, contained no members of any previous Oarsome Foursome although Tomkins won a bronze medal with Matthew Long in a coxless pair. Again at Athens 2004 the coxless four contained all new faces while Tomkins and Ginn took gold in a pair and Mike McKay rowed in the VIII. At Beijing in 2008 Tomkins rowed in the six seat of the Australian VIII while Ginn won gold in a coxless pair with Duncan Free.

In 2004, they released a DVD titled Oarsome Foursome Fitness -  a general fitness training guide not necessarily aimed at rowers (although there is a section on perfecting your rowing stroke).

4th variation
At London 2012, Drew Ginn provided a single link to the previous Foursomes  when he was selected in the two seat of Australia's coxless four with James Chapman, Josh Dunkley-Smith and Will Lockwood. That combination won the Olympic silver medal.

References

Australian male rowers
Nicknamed groups of Olympic competitors
Olympic medalists in rowing
Olympic gold medalists for Australia
Olympic silver medalists for Australia
Rowing crews
Quartets